Dr Helen Morales is a classicist and the second Argyropoulos Chair in Hellenic Studies at the University of California, Santa Barbara. She is best known for her scholarship on the ancient novel, gender and sexuality, and Greek mythology, as well for her public writing and lectures.

Publications

Dr Morales is Editor of the classics journal Ramus  and on the editorial board of the journal Eidolon.

She has been quoted in articles on Classics in The New York Times and The New Yorker.

Her published books and volumes include:
 Intratextuality: Greek and Roman Textual Relations, edited with Alison Sharrock (2001, Oxford University Press)
 Vision and Narrative in Achilles Tatius' Leucippe and Clitophon (2005, Cambridge University Press)
 Greek Mythology: A Very Short Introduction (2007, Oxford University Press)
 Petronius, Satyricon, edited with introduction and notes, (2011, Penguin Classics)
 Greek Fiction, commissioned new translations, edited, with introduction and notes, (2011, Penguin Classics)
 Pilgrimage to Dollywood (2014, University of Chicago Press)
 New Essays on Homer: Language, Violence, and Agency, co-edited with Sara Lindheim (2015, Cambridge University Press)
 Antigone Rising: The Subversive Power of the Ancient Myths (2020, Bold Type Books)

Academic career
Morales received her undergraduate degree from New Hall, Cambridge and her doctorate from Newnham College, Cambridge. While at the University of Cambridge, she was taught by Mary Beard (classicist).

She held academic positions at the University of Reading and Arizona State University before returning to Cambridge as a faculty member in 2001. She succeeded Apostolos Athanassakis as Argyropoulos Chair at UCSB in 2012.

In 1998–1999 she was a Fellow at the Center for Hellenic Studies in Washington DC, and in 2011 was the Gail A. Burnett Lecturer at San Diego State University.

Early life and family
Morales grew up on the south coast of England, to a mother from Yorkshire and a father from Cyprus. She was born in Eastbourne and attended schools in Eastbourne and Brighton.

Her maternal aunt was the British theatre director Annie Castledine.

References

1970 births
Living people
British classical scholars
Women classical scholars
University of California, Santa Barbara faculty
Alumni of New Hall, Cambridge
Alumni of Newnham College, Cambridge
Classical scholars of the University of Reading
Arizona State University faculty
People from Eastbourne